Tulketh is an electoral ward in Preston, Lancashire, England. The Tulketh Mill is a notable landmark in the ward.

Tulketh returns three members to Preston City Council, elected 'in thirds' in first past the post elections each year. The ward is currently represented by three Labour councillors.

The ward forms part of the Lancashire County Council electoral division of Preston Central South. Tulketh is commonly thought of as part of Ashton on Ribble.

Etymology 
The name Tulketh is of Brittonic origin. The first element is tul meaning "hollow, hole, cave", while the second, -cę:d, means "woodland, forest" (c.f Welsh twll-coed). A common compound-formation in Welsh and Cornish toponymy, the name implies an appellative meaning of "broken woodland".

Current members

Demographics
From the 2001 census, Tulketh ward had a population of 6,886. Of this figure, just under three-quarters (74.5) described themselves as Christian. Over 10% of the population are retired, and just under 10% are students. Here is a 2011 ethnic breakdown of Tulketh.

Geography
The ward is in the northwest of Preston, taking in terraced streets and detached houses from outside the University of Central Lancashire campus to suburbia on both sides of the main Blackpool Road, and to the west of the A6 Garstang Road.

See also
Preston local elections

References

 
Wards of Preston